Established in 1997, South Granville (or less commonly "Uptown") is an upscale Business Improvement Area (BIA) and neighbourhood south of Vancouver's downtown core, centred along Granville Street and bordered by the neighbourhoods of Kitsilano, Fairview and Shaughnessy.

Separated from Downtown by False Creek, the area runs along Granville Street from the south side of the Granville Street Bridge up to 16th Ave, where storefronts are replaced by the residences and hedges of Shaughnessy.

1907 has been decided as the unofficial birth year of the neighbourhood. In that year Richard Marpole drew up plans for Shaughnessy Heights, the Canadian Pacific Railway's newest subdivision south of 16th Ave, pitched as an alternative to the then-upscale West End ("Blueblood Alley"). This is now known as "First Shaughnessy", or simply Shaughnessy. That same year, what was once Centre Street was given its present name, Granville Street, as the portion north of the bridge already bore that name. In 2007, the South Granville BIA commemorated the neighbourhood's centennial by encasing a state-of-the-art, stainless steel time capsule in concrete and stone under the entrance of the historic Stanley Theatre.

As well as being a fast-growing neighbourhood of residences, shops and restaurants, South Granville is home to a vibrant arts and culture scene. The neighbourhood contains a strip, between Broadway and the foot of the Granville Bridge, known as "Gallery Row" which is home to a number of art galleries: Bau-Xi Gallery, Douglas Reynolds Gallery, Ian Tan Gallery, Petley Jones Gallery, Uno Langmann. The South Granville Gallery Association (SGGA) represents the leading fine art galleries on Gallery Row. Further south, the neighbourhood is home to the historic Stanley Theatre, built in 1931. Once a popular cinema in its early days, the Stanley Theatre is now the stage of the Arts Club Theatre Company and the Industrial Alliance Stage.

References

External links
Information on South Granville from the South Granville Business Improvement Association

Neighbourhoods in Vancouver